Buddy Lucas may refer to:

 Buddy Lucas (swimmer) (1931–2002), New Zealand swimmer
 Buddy Lucas (musician) (1914–1983), American jazz saxophonist